871 is an album by British electronic musician Four Tet, under his alias 00110100 01010100, released on Christmas Day 2020 on his own label Text Records.

Description
The album's material was produced between August 1995 and January 1997, before the release of the first Four Tet EP in 1998.

Damien Morris wrote in The Observer that "Its music mostly dates back to 1996, and you can hear the teenaged Hebden essaying plangent shoegaze, ambient techno and trip-hop..."

Philip Sherburne wrote for Pitchfork that "There are blasts of overdriven electric guitar, effects-pedal experiments steeped in line noise, and even a folk song played on hard-panned acoustic guitars. [. . .] There are glimmers of the palette that would come to define Four Tet's work, but mostly these pieces show the influence of the decade's mischievously experimental spirit."

Tracklisting

See also
0181 (album)

References

Four Tet albums
Text Records albums
Albums produced by Kieran Hebden
2020 albums